Spilve may refer to:

Spilve, Riga, a neighborhood in Riga, Latvia
Spilve Airport, an airport in Riga, Latvia